Legislative elections and local elections were held in the Philippines on May 14, 2001, independent candidate Noli de Castro, a former television anchor of TV Patrol of ABS-CBN was announced as the topnotcher.  This is the first synchronized national and local elections held after the ouster of former president Joseph Estrada in January due to a military-backed civilian uprising (popularly known as EDSA II) with pro-Estrada counter-protests that followed right before Election Day. On February 20, 2007, the Supreme Court of the Philippines ruled that former senator Gregorio Honasan lost in the 2001 Philippine elections and lost to Sen. Ralph Recto but declared constitutional the special election for the remaining three-year term of Teofisto Guingona.

Candidates

Administration coalition

Opposition coalition

Other notable candidates

Note: Party affiliation based on Certificate of Candidacy.

Results

Senate

Final COMELEC Tally for Senators as of August 30, 2001.

House of Representatives

Elections at congressional districts

Party-list election

See also
Commission on Elections
Politics of the Philippines
Philippine elections
Philippine midterm election
12th Congress of the Philippines

References
SWS Media Release. Accessed on March 15, 2007.

External links
 Official website of the Commission on Elections
 Official website of the House of Representatives 

 
2001
2001 elections in the Philippines
May 2001 events in the Philippines